Cisthene ruficollis is a moth of the family Erebidae. It was described by William Schaus in 1896. It is found in the Brazilian states of São Paulo and Paraná.

References

Cisthenina
Moths described in 1896